Aminabad is a subdivision of Hyderabad District in Sindh, Pakistan. It is a mainly Ismaili  community, it is located at 28°56'20N 70°48'15E.

References

Populated places in Sindh
Hyderabad District, Pakistan